J. Walter Smith (1869 - August 25, 1931) was the editor of the American edition of The Strand Magazine.

Biography 
He was born in 1869.  He was the publisher of the American edition of The Strand Magazine. He died on August 25, 1931 of "tuberculosis, complicated with diabetes" in Rutland, Massachusetts.

References 

1869 births
1931 deaths
The Strand Magazine